Dalby Norreskog is a nature reserve located close to Dalby and Lund in southern Sweden. It forms Dalby Hage together with Dalby Söderskog National Park. The name means the "northern forest", the Northwoods.

References

Scania
Nature reserves in Sweden
Protected areas established in 1979
Geography of Skåne County